Corinne J. Wood (May 28, 1954 – May 18, 2021) served as the 44th Lieutenant Governor of the US state of Illinois from 1999 to 2003. After graduating Phi Beta Kappa from the University of Illinois and Loyola University School of Law, Wood was named general counsel to the Illinois Commissioner of Banks and Trusts.

Background 
Born as Corinne Gieseke in Barrington, Illinois, Wood (a resident of Lake Forest) was the first female Lieutenant Governor of Illinois. A Republican, she was elected on Gov. George Ryan's ticket in 1998. An attorney, she served in the Illinois House of Representatives for one term prior to her election as lieutenant governor.

As Lieutenant Governor 
As Lieutenant Governor, she was a frequent speaker across Illinois on a number of issues, including rural affairs, economic development, and women's health.  The first two issues were part of her portfolio as Lieutenant Governor, and the third was added by her to her office's duties. While Lieutenant Governor, she gained national prominence for leading a campaign against Abercrombie & Fitch for sexually provocative pictures in the catalogue. As part of her campaign against the store, Wood urged a boycott and a letter writing campaign.

She also launched a statewide campaign to increase funding for breast cancer research through the "A Check for a Cure" Illinois tax return check-off when she first entered office.

Campaign for Governor 
In 2002, she sought the Republican nomination for Governor of Illinois to succeed the retiring Ryan.  While she was not a part of the scandals that ended the Ryan Administration, Wood was hurt by this in the primary, along with her reputation for being a moderate Republican. She finished third in the primary losing to Attorney General Jim Ryan.

Death 
She battled breast cancer in the late 1990s and announced that she was resuming treatment for her cancer in January 2006. Wood ultimately died from breast cancer on May 18, 2021.

See also 
 List of female lieutenant governors in the United States

References

External links 
 
 

|-

1954 births
2021 deaths
American people of German descent
Lieutenant Governors of Illinois
Republican Party members of the Illinois House of Representatives
Women state legislators in Illinois
People from Barrington, Illinois
People from Lake Forest, Illinois
Loyola University Chicago School of Law alumni
University of Illinois alumni
Illinois lawyers
Deaths from breast cancer
21st-century American women